{{safesubst:#invoke:RfD|||month = March
|day = 13
|year = 2023
|time = 15:06
|timestamp = 20230314150624

|content=
REDIRECT Human feces

}}